Socialist Youth is the youth organisation of the Socialist Party of Portugal.
The Socialist Youth (JS) is a political organization that emerges as a youth party of the Socialist Party. It is integrated, politically and ideologically, into democratic socialism and social-democracy. It is made up of young people over 14 and under 30, Portuguese or resident in Portugal. At the moment, the organization’s Secretary-General is Miguel Costa Matos, chosen in the XXI National Congress of the JS, that took place in December 2020. 
It is a political organization of young Portuguese who accept the political platform approved in Congress, the Declaration of Principles and Program of the Socialist Party, with the aim of building a more just and solidary society in Portugal.
The Socialist Youth finds in this political and ideological current a progressive project of social transformation, centered on the values of Equality, Solidarity and Freedom.

Values 
Composed of young people who say they are dissatisfied with the world in which they live, this organization defends a society free of injustices, inequalities and poverty that knows how to respect and be tolerant of differences. They are fighting for a society where development is sustainable and therefore respects and protects the environment. It seeks a thriving and culturally advanced society capable of ensuring quality education, quality health care, social protection and rights-based employment for all. The young socialists are internationalists and radicals in the defense of peace. It is for this reason that the political intervention of this organization also goes through the search for and defense of an alternative to a world marked by inequality, poverty and war.

Ends 
The Socialist Youth is a political youth organization that strives for the implementation of the values of democratic socialism and of the Republic, aiming for a freer, fairer and more solidary society, respecting the principles of respect for the dignity of the human person, pluralism of expression and internal and external democracy.

The Socialist Youth strive to correct social inequalities by implementing a political platform that promotes the integration of individuals into the community in which they live, regardless of their ancestry, gender, age, ethnicity, sexual orientation, language, origin, religion, political, philosophical or ideological convictions, education or economic situation.
The action of the Socialist Youth aims at the internationalization of democratic socialism.
The Socialist Youth contribute to the peaceful resolution of any international conflicts, as well as to safeguarding the right of self-determination of all peoples.
The Socialist Youth condemns and fights against any form of armed aggression or terrorist practice, regardless of its ideological or political support.
The Socialist Youth is committed to the construction of a European Union that takes international responsibility for the values and democratic principles that guide the Peoples of Europe and the Portuguese Republic.
The Socialist Youth contribute to the formation, participation and political representation of the Portuguese youth.

Structures of the Socialist Youth 
Local and National Intervention

JS operates locally, through its Concelhias structures. These, in turn, are organized into 21 District and Regional Federations.

Autarchic Intervention 
In addition to these structures, the National Association of Young Socialist Authors (ANJAS) coordinates the work of local elected officials in the parishes and municipalities, disseminating good practices and assisting political coordination at the level of local power.

Organization of Socialist Students 
The National Organization of Socialist Students (OES) is the representative structure of all students affiliated to the Socialist Youth and organizes itself in school, federative and national structures. As a result of the statutory changes introduced at the end of 2014, the structure merges into the same organization the former National Organization of Socialist Students of Higher Education (ONESES) and the National Organization of Socialist Students of Basic and Secondary Education (ONESEBS).

The OES is responsible for pronouncing on the general lines of orientation and political intervention of the JS in the areas of Educational Policy, contributing to the articulation of the national intervention of the JS in Educational Institutions, namely through the formulation of proposals to the other organs of the Socialist Youth and manage the national network of Federations and Nuclei of Socialist Students.

The Nucleus of Socialist Students (NES) aims to represent the Socialist Youth in the institutions of Education where they are inserted, namely by stimulating the political debate and the diffusion of the program and decisions of the Socialist Youth. On the other hand, each NES is free to promote the activities that it deems appropriate, as well as to pronounce itself on the subjects related to the Establishment where it is inserted, in articulation with OES and with its Federation, when it exists.

Trade Union Intervention 
More recently, JS has created its Young Socialist Tendency, seeking to integrate into a national structure the nuclei in the area of employment and trade unionism.

International intervention 
On the external front, JS is a founding member of the European organization of young socialists ECOSY (now called YES - Young European Socialists), and is particularly committed to deepening the European project and strengthening its democratic and social components.

Working in support of an international order based on the principles of the Charter of the United Nations, JS is also a member of the IUSY - International Union of Socialist Youth and has reinforced its intervention in cooperation between organizations of Portuguese-speaking countries and the Ibero-American space .

List of Secretaries-General
16 February 1975 – 3 December 1978 - Arons de Carvalho
3 December 1978 – 11 January 1981 - José Leitão
11 January 1981 – 5 February 1984 - Margarida Marques
5 February 1984 – 29 April 1990 - José Apolinário
29 April 1990 – 6 March 1994 - António José Seguro
6 March 1994 – 14 May 2000 - Sérgio Sousa Pinto
14 May 2000 – July 2004 - Jamila Madeira
July 2004 – July 2008 - Pedro Nuno Santos
July 2008 – 18 July 2010 - Duarte Cordeiro
18 July 2010 – 2012 - Pedro Delgado Alves
2012 – 2014 João Torres
2014 –2016 - João Torres
2016 – 2018 - Ivan Gonçalves
2018  –2020 - Maria Begonha
2020 – Present Miguel Costa Matos

External links
 Official homepage of Juventude Socialista

References

Socialism in Portugal
Socialist Party (Portugal)
Youth wings of political parties in Portugal
Youth wings of social democratic parties